Unbreakable is the fourth full-length album by American rock band New Years Day, released on April 26, 2019, through Century Media Records. Loudwire named it one of the 50 best rock albums of 2019.

Track listing

References

2019 albums
New Years Day (band) albums